Simone Bertazzo (born 19 August 1982) is a retired Italian bobsledder and current bobsled coach who has competed since 2001. He won a bronze medal in the two-man event at the 2007 FIBT World Championships in St. Moritz.

Bertazzo also competed in two Winter Olympics, earning his best finish of tied for ninth in the four-man event at Vancouver in 2010.

References

External links
 
 
 

1982 births
Bobsledders at the 2006 Winter Olympics
Bobsledders at the 2010 Winter Olympics
Bobsledders at the 2014 Winter Olympics
Bobsledders at the 2018 Winter Olympics
Italian male bobsledders
Living people
Olympic bobsledders of Italy
Bobsledders of Centro Sportivo Carabinieri